Vasile Grigorcea was a Romanian diplomat. His main assignments were minister plenipotentiary of Romania to Hungary, Poland, United Kingdom and the Vatican.

His assignment to Hungary was cut short on September 30, 1936 due to the reshuffling of the Romanian diplomatic corps after the dismissal of Nicolae Titulescu.

As minister to Poland he arrived in Warsaw on August 30, 1939, replacing Richard Franasovici. He could not present his credentials before the outbreak of World War II. 

In 1940 he was appointed minister plenipotentiary to the Vatican. In this capacity he negotiated with the Vatican the relations of the Romanian Greek-Catholic Church whose dioceses had been divided after northern Transylvania had been ceded to Hungary following the Second Vienna Award.  He was recalled in 1941, being replaced by general Dănila Papp, a change which angered the Vatican. 
In 1943, Ion Antonescu, the Romanian Prime-Minister, requested that King Michael I of Romania dismiss baron Ioan Mocsony-Stârcea, marshal of the Royal Court. Vasile Grigorcea was proposed as one of the possible candidates, but declined the offer.

In the fall of 1943, Vasile Grigorcea was reappointed minister plenipotentiary to the Vatican. He discussed the concerns of Pope Pius XII regarding the Moscow Declaration and the dangers foreseen for the future of Eastern Europe.

References
 Dumitru Preda, Marius Bucur - 1940-1945. Inţelegere şi sprijin din partea Vaticanului – 
 Potra, George G. - Reacţii necunoscute la demiterea lui Titulescu 29 August 1936: O "mazilire perfidă" - Magazin Istoric, 1998, Nr. 6
 Petre Out – Mareşalul dispune, regele impune 

Romanian diplomats
Year of birth unknown